Matthew Kaminski (born November 11, 1971) is an American journalist working as the editor-in-chief of Politico. He is also the founding editor of Politico Europe, which launched on April 21, 2015. He was previously a foreign correspondent, opinion writer, and editor at The Wall Street Journal.

Early life and education

Kaminski was born in Warsaw, Poland, and emigrated to the United States in 1980. After graduating from Georgetown Day School, he earned a Bachelor of Arts degree in history from Yale University and a Master of Arts in international politics from the University of Paris.

Career 
While based in Kyiv from 1994 to 1997, Kaminski reported for the Financial Times and The Economist on the former Soviet Union. He subsequently joined The Wall Street Journal as Brussels correspondent, and in 2004 was awarded the Peter Weitz Prize by the German Marshall Fund for a series of columns about the European Union. In 2005, he became the editorial page editor of the Journal's European edition, based in Paris. He moved to New York to work on the editorial board in 2008, writing mostly about international affairs. His coverage of the Russo-Ukrainian War won an Overseas Press Club prize in 2015. He was also a finalist for the Pulitzer Prize in commentary. He joined Politico in December 2014.

Kaminski has also contributed to Tablet, an online magazine focused on Jewish interests.

References

External links
 Biography at Politico
 
 Politico Pierces the ‘Brussels Bubble’ With U.S.-Style Coverage
 The Progress 1000: Editors and Journalists

American male journalists
Yale College alumni
Living people
1971 births
Polish emigrants to the United States
Georgetown Day School alumni